Bergey may refer to:

Bill Bergey (born 1945), a former American collegiate and Professional Football player
David Hendricks Bergey (1860–1937), an American bacteriologist
Earle K. Bergey (1901–1952), an American illustrator who painted cover art for magazines and paperback books
Jake Bergey (born 1974), a retired lacrosse player
Josyane De Jesus-Bergey, a Franco/Portuguese poet who was born in La Rochelle, France in 1941

See also
Bergey's Manual of Systematic Bacteriology, the main resource for determining the identity of bacteria species, utilizing every characterizing aspect